Latchi, also spelled Lachi, Latsi and Lakki, is a small village that is part of the Polis municipality in Cyprus. It has a small harbour.

Altitude 
Latchi is located 7 m above sea level.

References

External links

Polis, Cyprus